Bradley Johannes Moolman (born 18 January 1991 in Welkom) is a South African rugby union footballer currently playing for the . His regular playing position is outside centre.

He represented the Golden Lions in the Currie Cup and Vodacom Cup in 2012 and 2013, having previously played for the Blue Bulls before making the move to Johannesburg along with brother Whestley ahead of the 2012 season.

References

1991 births
Alumni of Monument High School
Living people
Afrikaner people
Blue Bulls players
Golden Lions players
Rugby union centres
Rugby union players from Welkom
South Africa Under-20 international rugby union players
South African rugby union players